is a 2018 Japanese drama film, directed by Yōjirō Takita and written by Machiko Nasu. 
Stage Production was by Keralino Sandrovich, Director of Photography is Takeshi Hamada and the music was by Kei Ogura and Katsu Hoshi.

Plot 
The story starts in 1945, with Tetsu Ezure (played by Sayuri Yoshinaga) and her sons living in Sakharin. The Russian army invades, and Tetsu flees with her sons, while her husband (played by Abe Hiroshi) stays behind to fight. The family manage to flee to Hokkaido, and eventually settle in Abashiri. The plot then skips forward to 1971, and one of the sons, Shujiro (Masato Sakai) is now an executive at a US Multi National Hot Dog sales company. While visiting Sapporo, he encounters his mother, from whom he had previously become estranged. His mother, now down on her luck, seeks his help. while he and his wife are reluctant to assist.  The plot looks at the past of the family.

Upon realising something is wrong with her, partially related to her post traumatic stress disorder, she leaves to go back to her original house in Abashii, however, it has been demolished. Shujiro, reaching out to his mother, accompanies her through the plains of Hokkaido, where they encounter stories of the past.

Cast 
Sayuri Yoshinaga as Tetsu Ezure 
Masato Sakai as Shujiro Ezure 
Ryoko Shinohara as Mari Ezure 
Tsurube Shofukutei as bar owner
Ittoku Kishibe as Kazuo Yamaoka 
Reiko Takashima as Mitsue Shimada
Masatoshi Nakamura as Daikichi Okabe 
Ken Yasuda as Hisashi Sugimoto
Katsuya Maiguma as Iwaki
Tōru Nomguchi as Manabu Kimura
Yukijirō Hotaru
Hiroshi Abe as Tokujiro Ezure 
Koichi Sato as Shinji Sugawara

Box office 
The film took $2 million from 351 screens on its first weekend showing in Japan.

References

External links
  
 

2018 films
2018 drama films
Films directed by Yōjirō Takita
Japanese drama films
2010s Japanese-language films
Films set in Hokkaido
Films set in Sakhalin
2010s Japanese films